Mission Hills is a suburban neighborhood in the City of Los Angeles, California, located in the San Fernando Valley.

It is near the northern junction of the Golden State Freeway (I-5) and the San Diego Freeway (I-405). The Ronald Reagan Freeway (SR-118) bisects the community.  Mission Hills is at the northern end of the long Sepulveda Boulevard. Other main thoroughfares are San Fernando Mission Boulevard, Woodman Avenue, and Rinaldi, Brand, Chatsworth, Devonshire, and Lassen Streets. The boundaries are roughly Sepulveda Blvd and Interstate 405 to the west, Interstate 5 to the north and east, Van Nuys Boulevard to the southeast, and Lassen Street to the south. The Granada Hills community lies to the west, Sylmar to the north, the city of San Fernando to the northeast, Pacoima to the east, Arleta to the southeast, and Panorama City to the south.

The historical town was Hickson, now is named Mission Hills for the nearby Spanish Mission San Fernando Rey de España (1784). It includes the Andrés Pico Adobe, the second oldest residence still standing in Los Angeles. The San Fernando Mission Cemetery, located a short distance away, is one of the oldest active cemeteries within the San Fernando Valley.

Demographics

The 2010 U.S. census counted 18,496 residents in the area's 91345 ZIP Code. The median age was 36.3, and the median yearly household income at that time was $62,426.

In 2009, the Los Angeles Timess "Mapping L.A." project supplied the following numbers for the community of Mission Hills. Population: 18,237; median household income: $75,675.

Education
Residents are zoned to schools in the Los Angeles Unified School District.
Mission Hills has one private school within its boundaries; Bishop Alemany High School which is run by the Archdiocese of Los Angeles.

Medical centers
The community is serviced by Providence Holy Cross Medical Center, Facey Medical Group, and a newly opened Kaiser Permanente.

Government and infrastructure

Postal services

The United States Postal Service operates the Mission City Post Office at 10919 Sepulveda Boulevard.

Health services

The Los Angeles County Department of Health Services operates the Pacoima Health Center in Pacoima, serving Mission Hills.

Police

In May 2005, the Los Angeles Police Mission Area was established as the 19th station built in the City of Los Angeles.  This police station serves the communities of Mission Hills, Sylmar, North Hills, Arleta, and Panorama City.

Fire & EMS

The City of Los Angeles Fire Department provides fire and emergency medical services from Station 75. This consists of two engines (E75 & E275), a ladder truck (T75), and both an advanced life support ambulance (Rescue 75) and a basic life support ambulance (Rescue 875).

Federal representation

Mission Hills is represented in the United States Senate by California's Senators Dianne Feinstein and Alex Padilla.
The community of Mission Hills is located within California's 29th congressional district represented by Democrat Tony Cárdenas.

State representation

Mission Hills is located within California's 39th State Assembly district represented by Democrat Luz Rivas and California's 18th State Senate district represented by Democrat Robert Hertzberg.

Local representation

Mission Hills is located within Los Angeles City Council District 7 represented by Monica Rodriguez.

Economy

Tourism
Tourists visit the Mission San Fernando Rey de España, a historical mission.
The Andrés Pico Adobe is the second-oldest adobe home in the city of Los Angeles.

Notable natives
 
People who were born in Mission Hills include:

 Ryan Braun (major league baseball All Star and MVP outfielder)
 Jessica Cosby (Olympic athlete; track and field)
 Michael Kuluva (fashion designer) 
 George Lopez (comedian)
 Scott McAfee (actor)
 Dan Eller (professor)

References

 
Communities in the San Fernando Valley
Neighborhoods in Los Angeles